Events from the year 1859 in China.

Incumbents 
 Xianfeng Emperor (10th year)

Events 
 Nian Rebellion
 Second Opium War
 Battle of Taku Forts (1859)
 Taiping Rebellion
 Hong Rengan arrives in Tianjing, reunited with Hong Xiuquan
 Miao Rebellion (1854–73)
 Amur Annexation
 Panthay Rebellion